Interosseous artery may refer to

 Anterior interosseous artery
 Common interosseous artery
 Interosseous recurrent artery
 Posterior interosseous artery